is a railway station on the East Japan Railway Company (JR East) Tsugaru Line located in the town of Imabetsu, Aomori Prefecture, Japan.

Lines

Station layout
Tsugaru-Hamana Station has one ground-level side platform serving a single bi-directional track. The station is unattended.

History
Tsugaru-Hamana Station was opened on December 10, 1960 as a station on the Japanese National Railways (JNR). With the privatization of the JNR on April 1, 1987, it came under the operational control of JR East.

Surrounding area

See also
List of railway stations in Japan

External links

 

Stations of East Japan Railway Company
Railway stations in Aomori Prefecture
Tsugaru Line
Imabetsu, Aomori
Railway stations in Japan opened in 1960